Nong Qunhua (born July 20, 1966) is a former international badminton player from China who specialized in women's doubles.

Career
Nong was one of the world's leading women's doubles players of the early 1990s, winning the IBF World Championships in 1991 with Guan Weizhen and in 1993 with Zhou Lei. With Guan, Nong also won the 1990 Asian Games, was a silver medalist at the 1992 Olympics in Barcelona, and was a runner-up at the 1992 All England Championships. With Zhou Lei she won the Thailand and Hong Kong Opens in 1992. Nong was a member of world champion Chinese Uber Cup (women's international) teams in 1990 and 1992

References

External links
Database Olympics profile

1966 births
Living people
Badminton players from Guangxi
Badminton players at the 1992 Summer Olympics
Olympic badminton players of China
Olympic silver medalists for China
Olympic medalists in badminton
Asian Games medalists in badminton
People from Nanning
Chinese female badminton players
Badminton players at the 1990 Asian Games
Zhuang people
Medalists at the 1992 Summer Olympics
Asian Games gold medalists for China
Medalists at the 1990 Asian Games